I'll Be Alright may refer to:

 I'll Be Alright (album), a 2000 album by Duane Steele
 "I'll Be Alright" (Anggun song), released in 2006
 "I'll Be Alright" (Passion Pit song), released in 2012
 "I'll Be Alright", a 2007 song by Sarah Geronimo from Taking Flight